The Speaking Tree is an Indian weekly newspaper which is published by Bennett Coleman & Co. Ltd. It is one of the highest circulation weekly newspapers in India, with a circulation of 315,000 (2014) and 318,000 (2016). It is circulated in Mumbai, Delhi, Ahmedabad, Bangalore and Calcutta. In Mumbai, 204,067 newspapers are circulated. According to Comscore, the website has 8 million pageviews. It is available in Hindi as well as English.

References

External links 
 Official Website

Indian news websites
Newspapers published in Kolkata
Newspapers published in India
Weekly newspapers published in India
Newspapers published in Mumbai
The Times of India
Asian news websites
English-language newspapers published in India
Newspapers published in Bangalore
Newspapers published in Delhi
The Times Group
Companies of The Times Group
Publications of The Times Group